Buddo, sometimes spelled as Budo, is a hill in Wakiso District, Central Uganda.  Phonetically, Buddo is the correct spelling in Luganda, the native language of the local area.

Location
The coordinates of Buddo Hill are: 00 15 22N, 32 29 10E (Latitude:0.2560; Longitude:32.4860).

Overview
It carries cultural and academic significance. The cultural coronation site, where the Kabaka of Buganda is enthroned in a traditional ceremony is located on Buddo Hill and is known as Naggalabi Buddo. The hill is also the location of several elementary, middle and high schools, including Kings College Budo, a prestigious mixed boarding high school, attended by Buganda's Kings starting with Captain Sir Daudi Chwa II, the thirty-fourth (34th) Kabaka of the Kingdom of Buganda, who reigned between 1897 and 1939.

Landmarks
Buddo boasts of the following landmarks:

 Kings College Budo - A prestigious mixed boarding high school
 Budo junior school
 Budo Senior Secondary School - A mixed non-residential high school
 Kisozi High School Buddo
 Naggalabi Buddo - The site where the Kabaka of Buganda is enthroned in a traditional ceremony.
 Matutu Memorial Primary School
 St. Jude Primary School
 Abatec Islamic School

External links
Challenges and Constraints to Planning and Development in Kampala

See also
 Wakiso District
 Kings College Budo
 Kingdom of Buganda
 Central Region, Uganda

References

Populated places in Central Region, Uganda
Wakiso District
Buganda